The Westland C.O.W. Gun Fighter was an attempt to produce a fighter aircraft armed with a heavy calibre gun. The Coventry Ordnance Works (COW) 37 mm automatic gun was used, which had been developed for this purpose some years earlier.

Design and development
The design was in response to Air Ministry specification F.29/27. The design was an open cockpit  single engined metal monoplane with fabric covering. The aircraft design had already been submitted for specification F.20/27 as the Westland Interceptor but had lost out to the Gloster Gauntlet. The gun was in the fuselage and fired up at an angle, in order to attack bombers from below. This concept was similar to the Schräge Musik system used by Germany during World War II. The plane first flew at the end of 1930 but the trials did not give satisfactory results to continue with the idea.

The COW gun had been developed by 1918 for use in aircraft and had been trialled on the Airco DH.4.

Specifications (C.O.W. Gun Fighter)

See also

References

Bibliography

 James, Derek N. Westland Aircraft since 1915. London: Putnam, 1991. .
 Mason, Francis K. The British Fighter since 1912. Annapolis, Maryland: Naval Institute Press, 1992. .

External links
Westland COW Gun Fighter – British Aircraft Directory
Westland history Accessed 1 Feb 2007
http://users.skynet.be/Emmanuel.Gustin/history/NoAllowance.html  Accessed 1 Feb 2007

1930s British fighter aircraft
COW